Bouteville may refer to:

Bouteville, a commune in the Charente department in southwestern France
Boutteville, a commune in the Manche department in Normandy in northwestern France
François de Montmorency-Bouteville (1600–1627), second son of Louis de Montmorency, Comte de Bouteville

See also
Boutteville (disambiguation)